Grigorii V. Golosov, sometimes spelled as Grigory Golosov, is a Russian political scientist. He is a professor and the Head of Political Science Department at the European University at Saint Petersburg, Russia. He is notable as expert on political institutions and electoral systems, in particular, in application to Russia. His article "Electoral Systems and Party Formation in Russia" (Comparative Political Studies, Vol. 36, No. 8, October 2003, pp. 912–935) received a Lawrence Longley Award of the American Political Science Association for the best journal article on electoral systems and representation published in 2003.

Biography
Grigorii Golosov was born in 1963. After his doctoral studies, from 1987 to 1995, he worked at Novosibirsk State University. He has been working at the European University at Saint Petersburg since 1996. In August 2002 through May 2003, he was a Residential Fellow at the Woodrow Wilson International Center for Scholars. He is a member of editorial boards of Party Politics, Europe-Asia Studies, Slavic Review,  Problems of Post-Communism, and several other national and international journals.

Books

In English
 Authoritarian Party Systems: Party Politics in Autocratic Regimes, 1945–2019 (2022).
 Political Parties in the Regions of Russia: Democracy Unclaimed (2004).

In Russian
 Партийные системы России и стран Восточной Европы: генезис, структуры, динамика (1999).
 Российская партийная система и региональная политика (2006).
 Демократия в России: инструкция по сборке (2012).
Сравнительная политология и российская политика, 2010-2015 (2016).
Сравнительная политология: Учебник, 4-е изд, перераб. и доп. (2018).
Автократия, или Одиночество власти (2019).

Most cited articles
 "The Effective Number of Parties: A New Approach", Party Politics, Vol. 16, No. 2, March 2010, pp. 171–192.
 "Russia's Regional Legislative Elections, 2003-2007: Authoritarianism Incorporated", Europe-Asia Studies, Vol. 63, No. 3, May 2011, pp. 397–414

Recent articles
 "Smart Enough to Make a Difference? An Empirical Test of the Efficacy of Strategic Voting in Russia’s Authoritarian Elections", Post-Soviet Affairs, first published electronically on July 24, 2020 as doi:10.1080/1060586X.2020.1796386 (co-authored: Mikhail Turchenko and Grigorii V. Golosov).
 "Party Nationalization and the Translation of Votes into Seats under Single-Member Plurality Electoral Rules", Party Politics, Vol. 24, No. 2, March 2018, pp. 118–128.

References

Living people
Russian political scientists
European University at Saint Petersburg
Year of birth missing (living people)